Matarage Sirisena Amarasiri (5 September 1925 - 8 January 2007) was the 1st Chief Minister of Southern Province and 5th Governor of Uva.

References

Governors of Uva Province
Chief Ministers of Southern Province, Sri Lanka
Alumni of St. Aloysius' College, Galle
1925 births
2007 deaths
Deputy ministers of Sri Lanka